Athena is a proposed space mission that would perform a single flyby of asteroid 2 Pallas, the third largest asteroid in the Solar System.

If Athena is funded, it would share the launch vehicle with the Psyche and Janus spacecraft and fly its own trajectory for a Mars gravity assist to slingshot into the asteroid belt. It would take about two years to reach Pallas. The mission's principal investigator is Joseph O'Rourke, at Arizona State University.

The Athena spacecraft was examined in Category 1 of the 2018 NASA SIMPLEx competition and was eliminated before reaching Category 2; it will possibly be proposed at a later unknown time. The Athena mission was beaten by other mission concepts such as the TransOrbital TrailBlazer lunar orbiter.

Objectives 
The science goals and objectives include:
 to determine how differentiation varies on bodies with large proportions of ices and how they and evolved over time.
 to determine how the current population of asteroids evolved in time and space.
 to understand the role of water in the evolution of Pallas.
 to constrain the dynamical evolution of Pallas and asteroids in the Pallas impact family.

Athena would conduct visible imaging of the geology of Pallas with a miniature color (RGB) camera. Also, a radio science experiment would use continuous antenna pointing to Earth for two-way Doppler tracking to enable the determination of the mass of Pallas with a precision of <0.05%.

References 

Missions to main-belt asteroids
Proposed NASA space probes